Excitation, excite, exciting, or excitement may refer to:
 Excitation (magnetic), provided with an electrical generator or alternator
 Excite Ballpark, located in San Jose, California
 Excite (web portal), web portal owned by IAC
 Electron excitation, the transfer of an electron to a higher atomic orbital
 Excitement (film), a lost 1924 silent comedy by Robert F. Hill
 Sexual excitation
 Stimulation or excitation or excitement, the action of various agents on nerves, muscles, or a sensory end organ, by which activity is evoked
 "Exciting", a song by Hieroglyphics from the album The Kitchen

See also 
 Anticipation (emotion)
 Anxiety
 Endorphins
 Excitatory postsynaptic potential
 Excited (disambiguation)
 Excited state, of an atom, molecule or nucleus
 Exciter (disambiguation)
 Pleasure
 Psychomotor agitation